Downhill Racer is a 1969 American sports drama film starring Robert Redford, Gene Hackman and Camilla Sparv, and was the directorial debut of Michael Ritchie. Written by James Salter, based on the 1963 novel The Downhill Racers by Oakley Hall, the film is about a talented downhill skier who joins the United States Ski Team in Europe to compete in international skiing competitions. Sylvester Stallone appeared in one scene as an extra in his film debut.

Downhill Racer was filmed on location in Kitzbühel and Sankt Anton am Arlberg in Austria, Wengen in Switzerland, Megève and Grenoble in France and Boulder and Idaho Springs in Colorado, United States. The film received positive reviews upon its theatrical release; Roger Ebert called it "the best movie ever made about sports—without really being about sports at all."

Plot
American downhill skier David Chappellet arrives in Wengen, Switzerland to join the U.S. ski team along with fellow newcomer D. K. Bryan. Both men were summoned by team coach Eugene Claire to replace Tommy Herb, one of his top skiers, who was recently injured during an FIS competition. Raised in the small town of Idaho Springs, Colorado, Chappellet is a loner focused only on becoming a skiing champion, and shows little interest in being a team player. After refusing to race at the Lauberhorn because of a late starting position, he makes his European skiing debut at the Arlberg-Kandahar in Austria, where he finishes in an impressive fourth position. In the final race of the season at the Hahnenkamm-Rennen in Kitzbühel, Austria, he crashes.

That summer, Chappellet joins the team in Oregon for offseason training. He visits his father at his home in Idaho Springs, but they have little to say to one another. Chappellet drives into town and picks up an old girlfriend, but after they make love in the back seat of his father's old Chevrolet, he shows little interest in the girl's feelings. Later, when his father asks him why he is wasting his life on skiing, Chappellet reveals that he is racing as an amateur to become an Olympic champion. His father observes, "The world's full of 'em."

Back in France that winter, Chappellet wins the Grand Prix de Megève in France and soon attracts the attention of Machet, a ski manufacturer who wants Chappellet to use his skis for the advertising value, but Chappellet is more interested in Machet's attractive assistant Carole Stahl. After a chance encounter at a bakery, he and Carole spend some time together. They meet up again in Wengen, ski the slopes together and eventually make love.

At Kitzbühel, Chappellet wins the Hahnenkamm, but his cockiness alienates his teammates and coach, who feel that he is only concerned about himself. The team's top racer Johnny Creech tells assistant coach Mayo, "He's never been for the team, and he never will be." Mayo responds, "Well it's not exactly a team sport, is it?" Chappellet finishes the season with several impressive victories, ensuring his place on next season's Olympic team.

During the offseason, Chappellet and Carole continue to see each other. At the start of the third season, he invites her to spend Christmas with him, but after waiting several days alone, he realizes that she is not coming. He travels to Zurich to Machet's office to find her, but learns that she is spending Christmas with her family. The next week, Chappellet sees Carole in Wengen and is annoyed that she did not call and that she is with another man. After a brief confrontation, he realizes that their relationship is over.

Two weeks before the Olympics, and after a day of training at Wengen, Chappellet challenges Creech to a one-on-one race, and the two take off to the bottom as the coaches look on in horror. On the way down, Chappellet forces Creech into the stone wall of a narrow-arched bridge (Jungfrau railway overpass Wasserstation), and Creech barely escapes injury. The next day, during the Lauberhorn race, Creech is seriously injured during his run, leaving Chappellet as the team's best hope for an Olympic gold medal.

At the Winter Olympics, with Austrian champion Max Meier in first place, Chappellet performs one of his best runs, beating Meier's time and finishing in first place with all of the highly ranked racers having already run. However, an unheralded German skier in a later seed is turning in very fast split times. The fans fall quiet, and Chappellet takes notice of the German, watching nervously. As the German approaches the final schuss, he crashes, and Chappellet becomes an Olympic gold-medal champion. The German makes his way to the finish area, and Chappellet looks into his eyes briefly before being carried off in victory.

Cast

 Robert Redford as David Chappellet
 Gene Hackman as Eugene Claire
 Camilla Sparv as Carole Stahl
 Karl Michael Vogler as Machet
 Jim McMullan as Johnny Creech
 Kathleen Crowley as American newspaper woman
 Dabney Coleman as Mayo
 Joe Jay Jalbert as Tommy Herb
 Kenneth Kirk as D. K. Bryan
 Oren Stevens as Tony Kinsmith
 Jerry Dexter as Ron Engel
 Walter Stroud as Mr. Chappellet
 Carole Carle as Lena
 Rip McManus as Bruce Devore
 Christian Doermer as German skier
 Sylvester Stallone as Restaurant Patron (uncredited)

Production

Development and writing
The screenplay for Downhill Racer is loosely based on the 1963 novel The Downhill Racers by Oakley Hall. In February 1966, the film rights to the book passed from director Mark Robson to Paramount Pictures at a cost of $15,000 for producer Steve Alexander and screenwriter Graham Ferguson. After attempts to develop the project stalled, the new head of Paramount production, Robert Evans, used the project to entice Roman Polanski, a skiing enthusiast, to direct the film Rosemary's Baby for the studio. Although Robert Redford passed on Polanski's offer to star in both films, the young actor soon attached himself to the skiing film, taking it on as a pet project. Redford soon persuaded novelist James Salter to write a screenplay for the film, introducing him to Polanski and his partner, Gene Gutowski, who agreed to work on the film.

James Salter prepared notes for the story, which did not resemble Hall's novel—Salter had not even read the book. Salter's starting point for the story was provided by Polanski, who told the writer that the film should be a modern-day High Noon, where the sheriff is killed and someone is called in to replace him. For the film, the "sheriff" is the lead racer on the team who breaks his leg, and Chappellet is called in to replace him. Focused on directing Rosemary's Baby, Polanski soon left the project, and the studio sued Redford for walking away from the starring role. Redford later revived the project by pitching the story to Gulf+Western owner Charles Bluhdorn. Soon after, Redford found his director and decided to make the film cheaply in Europe. Charles Bluhdorn, who was Austrian, may have influenced the decision on film locations; he created the production company Wildwood.

In January 1968, Redford was named to produce and star and traveled with Salter to Grenoble and accompanied the U. S. ski team — traveling on buses, sleeping in hallways, taking in the atmosphere, and observing the athletes. One night in Grenoble, they discussed the central character of David Chappellet. Salter's inspiration for the character was the 1964 Olympic silver medal winner Billy Kidd of Vermont, who conveyed an "arrogant and aloof" quality. Redford, however, saw the Chappellet character as being more like Spider Sabich, the dynamic skier from Kyburz, California, who finished fifth that year in the slalom. While the character ultimately took on aspects of both role models, Salter's original scenes of tense dynamics between Chappellet and the coach survived the writing process. The original inspiration for the character is said to be Colorado's Buddy Werner of Steamboat Springs, (Chappellet was said to be from Idaho Springs, Colorado). Werner burst upon the downhill racing scene in Europe in the late 1950s and was the first American to win an F.I.S. downhill race. He was known for a reckless style but broke his leg in training two months before the 1960 Winter Olympics at Squaw Valley in which he would have been a favorite for a medal in the downhill. Werner died in an avalanche in Switzerland in 1964, while performing for a film crew.

In late December 1968, Ritchie signed on as director.

In 1969, a $6 million lawsuit was filed by Buck Holland and Jan Schimmel claiming that the film was based on their story Devil On His Hills, which they gave to Redford, and requesting Paramount to stop referring to the film being based on Hall's book. Before the lawsuit, Paramount had already deleted reference to Hall in advertising and on screen and sought an injunction from Hall interfering with distribution and claiming the film was based on his book. Despite Paramount's intention, some studio publicity was released crediting Hall. Hall filed a counterclaim against Paramount. Alexander was also in a legal dispute to gain executive producer credit.

Crew
As director Michael Ritchie admired the work of British director Ken Loach, Ritchie hired Brian Probyn and Kevin Sutton, the cameraman and sound man from Loach's film Poor Cow.

Filming
Three weeks before the film was due to be shot, Paramount cancelled the film due to its $3.5 million budget but after reducing the budget, filming went ahead. Downhill Racer was filmed on location in Wengen and Unterseen Switzerland, Kitzbühel and Sankt Anton am Arlberg in Austria, Megève and Grenoble in France, and Boulder and Idaho Springs in Colorado, United States. Parts of the film were also shot at Sundance in Utah. Most of the skiing footage was shot from January 11 to February 1, 1969, during four World Cup races: Internationales Lauberhorn in Wengen, Internationales Hahnenkamm-Rennen in Kitzbühel, Grand Prix de Megève, and Arlberg-Kandahar in Sankt Anton am Arlberg. The interior scenes of Chappellet's Idaho Springs house were filmed at Paramount Studios in southern California.

Sylvester Stallone appeared as an extra in the restaurant scene. A rare theater book listed that he was in this film. As Stallone was only an extra, he has no billing in the credits, and this book is now a very rare collectors' item.

Release

Theatrical
Downhill Racer premiered at the Granada Theatre in Reno, Nevada, on October 28, 1969. The film was released one month after Butch Cassidy and the Sundance Kid, also starring Redford. It was re-released in the U.S. in July 1984 at the Filmex (Los Angeles International Film Exposition) for a 50-hour Sports Movie Marathon on July 5–20. The British premiere was at Romaine Hart's Screen on the Green known as the "coolest cinema in London" and the audience included Richard Attenborough, Laurence Olivier and Brian Forbes.

Home media
Downhill Racer was released on DVD in Region 2 format on August 13, 2007 by Paramount Home Entertainment. The Criterion Collection DVD was released on November 17, 2009.

Reception

Critical response
On review aggregator Rotten Tomatoes, the film holds an approval rating of 85% based on 26 reviews, with an average rating of 7.13/10. The website's critics consensus reads, "Downhill Racer plunges the viewer thrillingly into the action of the sport -- and continues to hold the attention as a thoughtful drama." On Metacritic, the film has a weighted average score of 89 out of 100, based on 15 critics, indicating "universal acclaim".

In his review for the Chicago Sun-Times, Roger Ebert gave the film four out of four stars, calling it "the best movie ever made about sports—without really being about sports at all." In addition to praising the performances of Redford and Hackman, Ebert noted how well the film balanced the exciting action sequences and the less glamorous aspects of an athlete's life. Ebert wrote:

In his review for The New York Times, Roger Greenspun called Downhill Racer "a very good movie". Writing about the lead character David Chappellet, Greenspun observed, "His world is that international society of the well-exercised inarticulate where the good is known as 'really great,' and the bad is signified by silence. In appreciating that world, its pathos, its narcissism, its tensions, and its sufficient moments of glory, Downhill Racer succeeds with sometimes chilling efficiency."

In his review for Life magazine, Richard Schickel praised the film for both its esthetic beauty and its depiction of the brutal realities of competition. Schickel wrote:

Accolades

References

External links
 
 
 
 
 
Downhill Racer: Trailblazer an essay by Todd McCarthy at the Criterion Collection

1969 films
1960s sports drama films
American sports drama films
Films about the Winter Olympics
Films about Olympic skiing
Films based on American novels
Films directed by Michael Ritchie
Films scored by Kenyon Hopkins
Films set in Austria
Films set in Colorado
Films set in France
Films set in Switzerland
Films set in the Alps
Films shot in Austria
Films shot in Colorado
Films shot in France
Films shot in Switzerland
Films shot in Utah
1969 directorial debut films
1969 drama films
American skiing films
1960s English-language films
1960s American films